Azure Party, nicknamed Iranian Nazi Party and the "Black Shirts" was a fascist party in Iran with Germanophile and pro-Nazi Germany tendencies.

Founded by Ḥabib-Allāh Nowbaḵt, Fazlollah Zahedi, Abolqassem Kashani and Shams Qanatabadi were among the figures reportedly affiliated with the party.

References 

Political parties in Pahlavi Iran (1941–1979)
Fascism in Iran
Nazi parties
Far-right political parties
Anti-communist parties